Mary Agnes Kaiser (June 11, 1948 – July 10, 2011) was an American chemist. She worked at E. I. DuPont de Nemours and Company, where she was the first woman promoted to Senior Research Fellow.  A woman scientist of distinction, she was  internationally known for her work in environmental analytical chemistry.

Early life and education 
Kaiser was born in Pittston, Pennsylvania on June 11, 1948, to Fredolin Kaiser and Agnes Regina Searfoss Kaiser  and grew up in Exeter, Pennsylvania. She attended Wilkes College and obtained the Bachelor's degree in chemistry in 1970. She received her Master's degree from Saint Joseph's University in 1972, and a PhD in analytical chemistry from Villanova University in 1976.  Subsequently, she spent a year as a Graham Perdue Fellow at the University of Georgia, where she worked with Professor Lockhart Burgess (Buck) Rogers.

Career and research 
In 1977, Kaiser began working the DuPont Company, where she was the first woman to be promoted to the level of Senior Research Fellow.  Kaiser was an active member of the American Chemical Society, the Chromatography Forum of the Delaware Valley, the Eastern Analytical Symposium, and the Federation of Analytical Chemistry and Spectroscopy Societies. In 1985, she was the second woman ever elected Chair of the American Chemical Society's Division of Analytical Chemistry, and the first in the modern era.  She is the only person to have served as the President of the Eastern Analytical Symposium and as Chair of the Governing Board of the Federation of Analytical Chemistry and Spectroscopy Societies.  For her work in environmental chemistry at the DuPont Company, she became internationally known for the analysis of fluorine compounds in the environment.

Publications 
Aside from journal articles on various aspects of environmental analytical chemistry, in 1982, Kaiser and Robert L. Grob published Environmental Problem Solving Using Gas Chromatography. The book became a best-seller within the field.

Personal life
Kaiser was married to Professor Cecil R. Dybowski on May 12, 1979, at Villanova Chapel at Villanova University. They had a daughter, Marta M. Dybowski, Esquire.  Kaiser died on July 10, 2011, in Newark, Delaware, of the effects of metastatic breast cancer.

Awards 
 2009, ACS Delaware Section Award for "conspicuous scientific achievement"
 2004, Award for distinguished service in the advancement of analytical chemistry, ACS Division of Analytical Chemistry
 Villanova University Founders Award
 Chromatography Forum of the Delaware Valley Award

References 

American women chemists
DuPont people
Villanova University alumni
1948 births
2011 deaths
21st-century American women